Diduga barlowi is a moth of the family Erebidae first described by Jeremy Daniel Holloway in 2001. It is found on Borneo. The habitat consists of forested areas in the lowlands.

References

Nudariina
Moths described in 2001